The men's 1 mile event at the 1958 British Empire and Commonwealth Games was held on 24 and 26 July at the Cardiff Arms Park in Cardiff, Wales.

Medalists

Results

Heats
Qualification: First 3 in each heat (Q) qualify directly for the final.

Final

References

Athletics at the 1958 British Empire and Commonwealth Games
1958